Mabire is a critically endangered Afro-Asiatic language spoken in Oulek village in Chad.

Speakers 
As of a report published in 2001, there were three living speakers of Mabire, two of whom were an elderly brother and sister, named Terab and Balha, living in Oulek. The third speaker, Souleymane Dabanga, was the chief of the Mabire and lived in Katch.

Classification 
The Mabire language belongs to the Dangla group of Eastern Chadic, along with Dangaleat (Dangla) and Migaama (Migama).

Decline 
Fifty years ago, the Mabire lived in four large villages near Mount Mabire. These villages were Amdjaména, Arga, Mambire. The community disbanded following an epidemic, with the survivors assimilating into neighboring speech communities.

References

External links
 Mabire Profile at the Endangered Languages Project

East Chadic languages
Languages of Chad
Endangered Afroasiatic languages